The 189th New York State Legislature, consisting of the New York State Senate and the New York State Assembly, met from January 9, 1991, to December 31, 1992, during the ninth and tenth years of Mario Cuomo's governorship, in Albany.

Background
Under the provisions of the New York Constitution of 1938 and the U.S. Supreme Court decision to follow the One man, one vote rule, re-apportioned in 1982 by the Legislature, 61 Senators and 150 assemblymen were elected in single-seat districts for two-year terms. Senate and Assembly districts consisted of approximately the same number of inhabitants, the area being apportioned contiguously without restrictions regarding county boundaries.

At this time there were two major political parties: the Democratic Party and the Republican Party. The Conservative Party, the Right to Life Party, the Liberal Party, the New Alliance Party, the Libertarian Party, and the Socialist Workers Party also nominated tickets.

Elections
The New York state election, 1990, was held on November 6.  Governor Mario Cuomo and Lieutenant Governor Stan Lundine were re-elected, both Democrats. The elections to the other two statewide elective offices resulted in the re-election of the two incumbent officeholders: a Republican Comptroller, and a Democratic Attorney General. The approximate party strength at this election, as expressed by the vote for Governor, was: Democrats 2,086,000; Republicans 866,000; Conservatives 828,000; Right to Life 138,000; Liberals 71,000; New Alliance 31,000; Libertarians 25,000; and Socialist Workers 13,000.

22 of the sitting 23 women members of the legislature—State Senators Mary B. Goodhue (Rep.), a lawyer of Mount Kisco; Nancy Larraine Hoffmann (Dem.), of Syracuse; Olga A. Méndez (Dem.), of East Harlem; Velmanette Montgomery (Dem.), of Brooklyn; Suzi Oppenheimer (Dem.), of Mamaroneck; and Ada L. Smith (Dem.), of Queens; and Assemblywomen Barbara M. Clark (Dem.), of Queens; Elizabeth Connelly (Dem.), of Staten Island; Geraldine L. Daniels (Dem.), of the Bronx; Gloria Davis (Dem.), of the Bronx; Eileen C. Dugan (Dem.), of Brooklyn; Aurelia Greene (Dem.), of the Bronx; Earlene Hill Hooper (Dem.), of Hempstead; Rhoda S. Jacobs (Dem.), of Brooklyn; Cynthia Jenkins (Dem.), a librarian of Queens; Helen M. Marshall (Dem.), a teacher and librarian of Queens; Nettie Mayersohn (Dem.), of Queens; Patricia McGee (Rep.), of Franklinville; Catherine Nolan (Dem.), of Queens; Audrey Pheffer (Dem.), of Queens; Cecile D. Singer (Rep.), of Yonkers; and Helene Weinstein (Dem.), a lawyer of Brooklyn—were re-elected. Nancy Calhoun (Rep.), of Blooming Grove; Joan Christensen (Dem.), of Syracuse; Vivian E. Cook (Dem.) of Queens; Deborah J. Glick (Dem.), of Manhattan; Susan V. John (Dem.), of Rochester; and Frances T. Sullivan (Rep.), of Fulton; were also elected to the Assembly.

The New York state election, 1991, was held on November 5. Three vacancies in the Assembly were filled. Assemblywoman Helen M. Marshall was elected to the New York City Council.

On January 28, 1992, Joni A. Yoswein (Dem.), of Brooklyn, was elected to fill a vacancy in the Assembly. Thus the 189th Legislature began and ended with 28 women members, setting a new record.

Sessions
The Legislature met for the first regular session (the 214th) at the State Capitol in Albany on January 9, 1991; and recessed indefinitely in the early morning of July 4.

Mel Miller (Dem.) was re-elected Speaker of the Assembly.

Ralph J. Marino (Rep.) was re-elected Temporary President of the Senate.

On December 13, 1991, Speaker Mel Miller was convicted of a felony, and thus vacated his seat in the Assembly. On December 16, 1991, Saul Weprin (Dem.) was elected Speaker.

The Legislature met for the second regular session (the 215th) at the State Capitol in Albany on January 8, 1992; and recessed indefinitely on July 3.

In June, the Legislature re-apportioned the legislative districts. On June 24, 1992, the U.S. Department of Justice approved the redrawn districts with one exception. On June 30, 1992, the New York Court of Appeals also validated the new apportionment.

The Legislature met again from July 28 to 30, 1992.

State Senate

Senators
The asterisk (*) denotes members of the previous Legislature who continued in office as members of this Legislature. Joseph R. Holland, William J. Larkin Jr., Stephen M. Saland and William R. Sears changed from the Assembly to the Senate.

Note: For brevity, the chairmanships omit the words "...the Committee on (the)..."

Employees
 Secretary: Stephen F. Sloan

State Assembly

Assembly members
The asterisk (*) denotes members of the previous Legislature who continued in office as members of this Legislature.

Note: For brevity, the chairmanships omit the words "...the Committee on (the)..."

Employees
 Clerk: Francine Misasi

Notes

Sources
 The 1990 Elections: New York; The Legislature; G.O.P. Adds to Senate Majority While Democrats Keep Control of Assembly by Kevin Sack, in The New York Times on November 7, 1990
 Members of the New York State Assembly 1991 at UCSF library

189
1991 establishments in New York (state)
1992 disestablishments in New York (state)
1991 politics in New York (state)
1992 politics in New York (state)
1991 U.S. legislative sessions
1992 U.S. legislative sessions